Ocean University of China is a station on Line 11 of the Qingdao Metro. It opened on 23 April 2018 and it serves the nearby Ocean University of China.

Gallery

References

Qingdao Metro stations
Railway stations in China opened in 2018